"In My Arms" is a song by the Scottish electronic dance musician Mylo. The song appears on the album Destroy Rock & Roll and was released as a single in the UK on 16 May 2005. It contains samples from "Bette Davis Eyes" by Kim Carnes, and "Waiting for a Star to Fall" by Boy Meets Girl.

Track listings
12-inch
 "In My Arms" (Sharam Jey Remix)
 "In My Arms" (King Unique Re-edit)
 "In My Arms" (Linus Love Remix)
 "In My Arms" (M.A.N.D.Y Remix)

7-inch
 "In My Arms (Radio edit)
 "In My Arms (Poplar Computer Remix)

Charts

References

2005 singles
Mylo songs
Songs written by Jackie DeShannon
Songs written by Shannon Rubicam
Songs written by George Merrill (songwriter)
Songs written by Donna Weiss
2005 songs